Lambda Pegasi (λ Peg, λ Pegasi) is a fourth-magnitude star in the constellation Pegasus.

λ Pegasi is a yellow giant with stellar classification G8II-III. Its apparent magnitude was calibrated in 1983 at 3.96, yielding an absolute magnitude of -1.45. Parallax calculations place the star at a distance of roughly 112 parsecs from Earth, or 365 ± 10 light years away, about three times the distance of its line-of-sight double μ Pegasi.

In the constellation, Lambda and Mu lie to the southwest of Beta Pegasi, the nearest bright star.

References 

Pegasi, Lambda
G-type giants
Pegasus (constellation)
G-type bright giants
Pegasi, 47
112440
215665
8667
BD+22 4709